In the Roman Republic and the Roman Empire, the Latin word castrum, plural castra, was a military-related term.

In Latin usage, the singular form castrum meant 'fort', while the plural form castra meant 'camp'. The singular and plural forms could refer in Latin to either a building or plot of land, used as a fortified military base.

In English usage, castrum commonly translates to "Roman fort", "Roman camp" and "Roman fortress". However, scholastic convention tends to translate castrum as "fort", "camp", "marching camp" or "fortress".

Romans used the term castrum for different sizes of camps – including large legionary fortresses, smaller forts for cohorts or for auxiliary forces, temporary encampments, and "marching" forts. The diminutive form castellum was used for fortlets, typically occupied by a detachment of a cohort or a centuria.

For a list of known castra, see List of castra.

Etymology
Castrum appears in Oscan and Umbrian, two other Italic languages, suggesting an origin at least as old as Proto-Italic language.

Julius Pokorny traces a probable derivation from *k̂es-,  ("cut") in *k̂es-tro-m,  ("cutting tool").

These Italic reflexes based on *kastrom include Oscan  (genitive case) and Umbrian ,  (accusative case). They have the same meaning, says Pokorny, as Latin , an estate, or tract of land. This is not any land, but is a prepared or cultivated tract, such as a farm enclosed by a fence or a wooden or stone wall of some kind. Cornelius Nepos uses Latin  in that sense: when Alcibiades deserts to the Persians, Pharnabazus gives him an estate worth 500 talents in tax revenues. This is a change of meaning from the reflexes in other languages, which still mean some sort of knife, axe, or spear.

If this is the civilian interpretation, the military version must be "military reservation", a piece of land cut off from the common land around it and modified for military use. All castra must be defended by works, often no more than a stockade, for which the soldiers carried stakes, and a ditch. The  could be prepared under attack within a hollow square or behind a battle line. Considering that the earliest military shelters were tents made of hide or cloth, and all but the most permanent bases housed the men in tents placed in quadrangles and separated by numbered streets, one  may well have acquired the connotation of tent.

Linguistic development of the military castra
The commonest Latin syntagmata (here phrases) for the term  are:
  Permanent camp/fortresses
  Summer camp/fortresses
  Winter camp/fortresses
  /  Navy camp/fortresses

In Latin the term  is much more frequently used as a proper name for geographical locations: e.g., . Caerleon and Caerwent) and English suffixes -caster and -chester (e.g. Winchester and Lancaster).

, "son of the camps", was one of the names used by the emperor Caligula and then also by other emperors.

Description

A castrum was designed to house and protect the soldiers, their equipment and supplies when they were not fighting or marching.

The most detailed description that survives about Roman military camps is De Munitionibus Castrorum, a manuscript of 11 pages that dates most probably from the late 1st to early 2nd century AD.

Regulations required a major unit in the field to retire to a properly constructed camp every day. "… as soon as they have marched into an enemy's land, they do not begin to fight until they have walled their camp about; nor is the fence they raise rashly made, or uneven; nor do they all abide ill it, nor do those that are in it take their places at random; but if it happens that the ground is uneven, it is first levelled: their camp is also four-square by measure, and carpenters are ready, in great numbers, with their tools, to erect their buildings for them." To this end a marching column ported the equipment needed to build and stock the camp in a baggage train of wagons and on the backs of the soldiers.

Camps were the responsibility of engineering units to which specialists of many types belonged, officered by architecti, "chief engineers", who requisitioned manual labor from the soldiers at large as required. They could throw up a camp under enemy attack in as little as a few hours. Judging from the names, they probably used a repertory of camp plans, selecting the one appropriate to the length of time a legion would spend in it: tertia castra, quarta castra, etc. (a camp of three days, four days, etc.).

More permanent camps were castra stativa (standing camps). The least permanent of these were castra aestiva or aestivalia, "summer camps", in which the soldiers were housed sub pellibus or sub tentoriis, "under tents". Summer was the campaign season. For the winter the soldiers retired to castra hiberna containing barracks and other buildings of more solid materials, with timber construction gradually being replaced by stone. Castra hibernas held eight soldiers to a room, who slept on bunkbeds. The soldiers in each room were also required to cook their own meals and eat with their "roommates".

The camp allowed the Romans to keep a rested and supplied army in the field. Neither the Celtic nor Germanic armies had this capability: they found it necessary to disperse after only a few days.

The largest castra were legionary fortresses built as bases for one or more whole legions.

From the time of Augustus more permanent castra with wooden or stone buildings and walls were introduced as the distant and hard-won boundaries of the expanding empire required permanent garrisons to control local and external threats from warlike tribes. Previously, legions were raised for specific military campaigns and subsequently disbanded, requiring only temporary castra. From then on many castra of various sizes were established, many of which became permanent settlements.

Plan of forts

Sources and origins
From the most ancient times Roman camps were constructed according to a certain ideal pattern, formally described in two main sources, the De Munitionibus Castrorum and the works of Polybius. P. Fl. Vegetius Renatus has a small section on entrenched camps as well. The terminology varies but the basic plan is the same. The hypothesis of an Etruscan origin is a viable alternative.

Layout

The ideal enforced a linear plan for a camp or fort: a square for camps to contain one legion or smaller unit, a rectangle for two legions, each legion being placed back-to-back with headquarters next to each other. Laying it out was a geometric exercise conducted by experienced officers called metatores, who used graduated measuring rods called decempedae ("10-footers") and gromatici who used a groma, a sighting device consisting of a vertical staff with horizontal cross pieces and vertical plumb-lines. Ideally the process started in the centre of the planned camp at the site of the headquarters tent or building (principia). Streets and other features were marked with coloured pennants or rods.

The street plans of various present-day cities still retain traces of a Roman camp, for example Marsala in Sicily, the ancient Lilybaeum, where the name of the main street, the Cassaro, perpetuates the name "castrum".

Wall and ditch

The Castrum's special structure also defended from attacks.

The base (munimentum, "fortification") was placed entirely within the vallum ("wall"), which could be constructed under the protection of the legion in battle formation if necessary. The vallum was quadrangular aligned on the cardinal points of the compass. The construction crews dug a trench (fossa), throwing the excavated material inward, to be formed into the rampart (agger). On top of this a palisade of stakes (sudes or valli) was erected. The soldiers had to carry these stakes on the march. Over the course of time, the palisade might be replaced by a fine brick or stone wall, and the ditch serve also as a moat. A legion-sized camp always placed towers at intervals along the wall with positions between for the division artillery.

Interval
Around the inside periphery of the vallum was a clear space, the intervallum, which served to catch enemy missiles, as an access route to the vallum and as a storage space for cattle (capita) and plunder (praeda). Legionaries were quartered in a peripheral zone inside the intervallum, which they could rapidly cross to take up position on the vallum. Inside of the legionary quarters was a peripheral road, the Via Sagularis, probably a type of "service road", as the sagum, a kind of cloak, was the garment of soldiers.

Streets, gates and central plaza

Every camp included "main street", which ran through the camp in a north–south direction and was very wide. The names of streets in many cities formerly occupied by the Romans suggest that the street was called cardo or cardus maximus. This name applies more to cities than it does to ancient camps.

Typically "main street" was the via principalis. The central portion was used as a parade ground and headquarters area. The "headquarters" building was called the praetorium because it housed the praetor or base commander ("first officer"), and his staff. In the camp of a full legion he held the rank of consul or proconsul but officers of lesser ranks might command.

On one side of the praetorium was the quaestorium, the building of the quaestor (supply officer). On the other side was the forum, a small duplicate of an urban forum, where public business could be conducted. Along the Via Principalis were the homes or tents of the several tribunes in front of the barracks of the units they commanded.

The Via Principalis went through the vallum in the Porta Principalis Dextra ("right principal gate") and Porta Principalis Sinistra ("left, etc."), which were gates fortified with turres ("towers"). Which was on the north and which on the south depends on whether the praetorium faced east or west, which remains unknown.

The central region of the Via Principalis with the buildings for the command staff was called the Principia (plural of principium). It was actually a square, as across this at right angles to the Via Principalis was the Via Praetoria, so called because the praetorium interrupted it. The Via Principalis and the Via Praetoria offered another division of the camp into four quarters.

Across the central plaza (principia) to the east or west was the main gate, the Porta Praetoria. Marching through it and down "headquarters street" a unit ended up in formation in front of the headquarters. The standards of the legion were located on display there, very much like the flag of modern camps.

On the other side of the praetorium the Via Praetoria continued to the wall, where it went through the Porta Decumana. In theory this was the back gate. Supplies were supposed to come in through it and so it was also called, descriptively, the Porta Quaestoria. The term Decumana, "of the 10th", came from the arranging of manipuli or turmae from the first to the 10th, such that the 10th was near the intervallum on that side. The Via Praetoria on that side might take the name Via Decumana or the entire Via Praetoria be replaced with Decumanus Maximus.

Canteen
In peaceful times the camp set up a marketplace with the natives in the area. They were allowed into the camp as far as the units numbered 5 (half-way to the praetorium). There another street crossed the camp at right angles to the Via Decumana, called the Via Quintana, "5th street". If the camp needed more gates, one or two of the Porta Quintana were built, presumably named dextra and sinistra. If the gates were not built, the Porta Decumana also became the Porta Quintana. At "5th street" a public market was allowed.

Major buildings

The Via Quintana and the Via Principalis divided the camp into three districts: the Latera Praetorii, the Praetentura and the Retentura. In the latera ("sides") were the Arae (sacrificial altars), the Auguratorium (for auspices), the Tribunal, where courts martial and arbitrations were conducted (it had a raised platform), the guardhouse, the quarters of various kinds of staff and the storehouses for grain (horrea) or meat (carnarea). Sometimes the horrea were located near the barracks and the meat was stored on the hoof. Analysis of sewage from latrines indicates the legionary diet was mainly grain. Also located in the Latera was the Armamentarium, a long shed containing any heavy weapons and artillery not on the wall.

The Praetentura ("stretching to the front") contained the Scamnum Legatorum, the quarters of officers who were below general but higher than company commanders (Legati). Near the Principia were the Valetudinarium (hospital), Veterinarium (for horses), Fabrica ("workshop", metals and wood), and further to the front the quarters of special forces. These included Classici ("marines", as most European camps were on rivers and contained a river naval command), Equites ("cavalry"), Exploratores ("scouts"), and Vexillarii (carriers of vexillae, the official pennants of the legion and its units). Troops who did not fit elsewhere also were there.

The part of the Retentura ("stretching to the rear") closest to the Principia contained the Quaestorium. By the late empire it had developed also into a safekeep for plunder and a prison for hostages and high-ranking enemy captives. Near the Quaestorium were the quarters of the headquarters guard (Statores), who amounted to two centuries (companies). If the Imperator was present they served as his bodyguard.

Barracks

Further from the Quaestorium were the tents of the Nationes ("natives"), who were auxiliaries of foreign troops, and the legionaries themselves in double rows of tents or barracks (Strigae). One Striga was as long as required and 18 m wide. In it were two Hemistrigia of facing tents centered in its 9 m strip. Arms could be stacked before the tents and baggage carts kept there as well. Space on the other side of the tent was for passage.

In the northern places like Britain, where it got cold in the winter, they would make wood or stone barracks. The Romans would also put a fireplace in the barracks. They had about three bunk beds in it. They had a small room beside it where they put their armour; it was as big as the tents. They would also make these barracks if the fort they had was going to stay there for good.

A tent was 3 by 3.5 metres (0.6 m for the aisle), ten men per tent. Ideally a company took 10 tents, arranged in a line of 10 companies, with the 10th near the Porta Decumana. Of the c. 9.2 square metres of bunk space each man received 0.9, or about 0.6 by 1.5 m, which was only practical if they slept with heads to the aisle. The single tent with its men was called contubernium, also used for "squad". A squad during some periods was 8 men or fewer.

The Centurion, or company commander, had a double-sized tent for his quarters, which served also as official company area. Other than there, the men had to find other places to be. To avoid mutiny, it became extremely important for the officers to keep them busy.

A covered portico might protect the walkway along the tents. If barracks had been constructed, one company was housed in one barracks building, with the arms at one end and the common area at the other. The company area was used for cooking and recreation, such as gaming. The army provisioned the men and had their bread (panis militaris) baked in outdoor ovens, but the men were responsible for cooking and serving themselves. They could buy meals or supplementary foods at the canteen. The officers were allowed servants.

Sanitation
For sanitary facilities, a camp had both public and private latrines. A public latrine consisted of a bank of seats situated over a channel of running water. One of the major considerations for selecting the site of a camp was the presence of running water, which the engineers diverted into the sanitary channels. Drinking water came from wells; however, the larger and more permanent bases featured the aqueduct, a structure running a stream captured from high ground (sometimes miles away) into the camp. The praetorium had its own latrine, and probably the quarters of the high-ranking officers. In or near the intervallum, where they could easily be accessed, were the latrines of the soldiers. A public bathhouse for the soldiers, also containing a latrine, was located near or on the Via Principalis.

Territory

The influence of a base extended far beyond its walls. The total land required for the maintenance of a permanent base was called its territoria. In it were located all the resources of nature and the terrain required by the base: pastures, woodlots, water sources, stone quarries, mines, exercise fields and attached villages. The central castra might also support various fortified adjuncts to the main base, which were not in themselves self-sustaining (as was the base). In this category were speculae, "watchtowers", castella, "small camps", and naval bases.

All the major bases near rivers featured some sort of fortified naval installation, one side of which was formed by the river or lake. The other sides were formed by a polygonal wall and ditch constructed in the usual way, with gates and watchtowers. The main internal features were the boat sheds and the docks. When not in use, the boats were drawn up into the sheds for maintenance and protection. Since the camp was placed to best advantage on a hill or slope near the river, the naval base was usually outside its walls. The classici and the optiones of the naval installation relied on the camp for its permanent defense. Naval personnel generally enjoyed better quarters and facilities. Many were civilians working for the military.

Modifications in practice
This ideal was always modified to suit the terrain and the circumstances. Each camp discovered by archaeology has its own specific layout and architectural features, which makes sense from a military point of view.

If, for example, the camp was built on an outcrop, it followed the lines of the outcrop. The terrain for which it was best suited and for which it was probably designed in distant prehistoric times was the rolling plain. The camp was best placed on the summit and along the side of a low hill, with spring water running in rivulets through the camp (aquatio) and pastureland to provide grazing (pabulatio) for the animals. In case of attack, arrows, javelins and sling missiles could be fired down at an enemy tiring himself to come up. For defence troops could be formed in an acies, or "battle-line", outside the gates, where they could be easily resupplied and replenished, as well as being supported by archery from the palisade.

The streets, gates and buildings present depended on the requirements and resources of the camp. The gates might vary from two to six and not be centred on the sides. Not all the streets and buildings might be present.

Quadrangular camps in later times
Many settlements in Europe originated as Roman military camps and still show traces of their original pattern (e.g. Castres in France, Barcelona in Spain). The pattern was also used by Spanish colonizers in America following strict rules by the Spanish monarchy for founding new cities in the New World.

Many of the towns of England still retain forms of the word castra in their names, usually as the suffixes "-caster", "-cester" or "-chester" – Lancaster, Tadcaster, Worcester, Gloucester, Mancetter, Uttoxeter, Colchester, Chester, Manchester and Ribchester for example. Castle has the same derivation, from the diminutive castellum or "little fort", but does not usually indicate a former Roman camp. Whitley Castle however is an exception, referring to the Roman fort of Epiacum in Northumberland. It is now provided with a car park and café and open to the public under its Roman name of Epiacum.

Camp life
Activities conducted in a castra can be divided into ordinary and "the duty" or "the watch". Ordinary activity was performed during regular working hours. The duty was associated with operating the installation as a military facility. For example, none of the soldiers were required to man the walls all the time, but round-the clock duty always required a portion of the soldiers to be on duty at any time.

Duty time was divided into vigilia, the eight watches into which the 24-hour day was divided so they stood guard for 3 hours that day. The Romans used signals on brass instruments to mark time. These were mainly the buccina or bucina, the cornu and the tuba. As they did not possess valves for regulating the pitch, the range of these instruments was somewhat limited. Nevertheless, the musicians (Aenatores, "brassmen") managed to define enough signals for issuing commands. The instrument used to mark the passage of a watch was the buccina, from which the trumpet derives. It was sounded by a buccinator.

Ordinary life

Ordinary camp life began with a buccina call at daybreak, the first watch of the day. The soldiers arose at this time and shortly after collected in the company area for breakfast and assembly. The centurions were up before them and off to the principia where they and the equites were required to assemble. The regimental commanders, the tribunes, were already converging on the praetorium. There the general staff was busily at work planning the day. At a staff meeting the Tribunes received the password and the orders of the day. They brought those back to the centuriones, who returned to their company areas to instruct the men.

For soldiers, the main item of the agenda was a vigorous training session lasting about a watch long. Recruits received two, one in the morning and one in the afternoon. Planning and supervision of training were under a general staff officer, who might manage training at several camps. According to Vegetius, the men might take a  hike or a  jog under full pack, or swim a river. Marching drill was always in order.

Each soldier was taught the use of every weapon and also was taught to ride. Seamanship was taught at naval bases. Soldiers were generalists in the military and construction arts. They practiced archery, spear-throwing and above all swordsmanship against posts (pali) fixed in the ground. Training was taken very seriously and was democratic. Ordinary soldiers would see all the officers training with them including the praetor, or the Emperor, if he was in camp.

Swordsmanship lessons and use of the shooting range probably took place on the campus, a "field" outside the castra, from which English camp derives. Its surface could be lightly paved. Winter curtailed outdoor training. The general might in that case have sheds constructed, which served as field houses for training. There is archaeological evidence in one case of an indoor equestrian ring.

Apart from the training, each soldier had a regular job on the base, of which there were a large variety from the various kinds of clerks to the craftsmen. Soldiers changed jobs frequently. The commander's policy was to have all the soldiers skilled in all the arts and crafts so that they could be as interchangeable as possible. Even then the goal was not entirely achievable. The gap was bridged by the specialists, the optiones or "chosen men", of which there were many different kinds. For example, a skilled artisan might be chosen to superintend a workshop. Soldiers were also expected to build the camp upon arrival before engaging in any sort of warfare after a day's march.

The supply administration was run as a business using money as the medium of exchange. The aureus was the preferred coin of the late republic and early empire; in the late empire the solidus came into use. The larger bases, such as Moguntiacum, minted their own coins. As does any business, the base quaestorium required careful record keeping, performed mainly by the optiones. A chance cache of tablets from Vindolanda in Britain gives us a glimpse of some supply transactions. They record, among other things, the purchase of consumables and raw supplies, the storage and repair of clothing and other items, and the sale of items, including foodstuffs, to achieve an income. Vindolanda traded vigorously with the surrounding natives.

Another feature of the camp was the military hospital (valetudinarium, later hospitium). Augustus instituted the first permanent medical corps in the Roman army. Its physicians, the medici ordinarii, had to be qualified physicians. They were allowed medical students, practitioners and whatever orderlies they needed; i.e., the military hospitals were medical schools and places of residency as well.

Officers were allowed to marry and to reside with their families on base. The army did not extend the same privileges to the men, who were not allowed to marry. However, they often kept common law families off base in communities nearby. The communities might be native, as the tribesmen tended to build around a permanent base for purposes of trade, but also the base sponsored villages (vici) of dependents and businessmen. Dependants were not allowed to follow an army on the march into hostile territory.

Military service was for about 25 years. At the end of that time, the veteran was given a certificate of honorable discharge (honesta missio). Some of these have survived engraved on stone. Typically they certify that the veteran, his wife (one per veteran) and children or his sweetheart were now Roman citizens, which is a good indication that troops, which were used chiefly on the frontier, were from peoples elsewhere on the frontier who wished to earn Roman citizenship. However, under Antoninus Pius, citizenship was no longer granted to the children of rank-and-file veterans, the privilege becoming restricted only to officers.

Veterans often went into business in the communities near a base. They became permanent members of the community and would stay on after the troops were withdrawn, as in the notable case of Saint Patrick's family.

Duties

Conducted in parallel with the ordinary activities was "the duty", the official chores required by the camp under strict military discipline. The Legate was ultimately responsible for them as he was for the entire camp, but he delegated the duty to a tribune chosen as officer of the day. The line Tribunes were commanders of Cohortes and were approximately the equivalent of colonels. The 6 tribunes were divided into units of two, with each unit being responsible for filling the position of officer of the day for two months. The two men of a unit decided among themselves who would take what day. They could alternate days or each take a month. One filled in for the other in case of illness. On his day, the tribune effectively commanded the camp and was even respected as such by the Legate.

The equivalent concept of the duties performed in modern camps is roughly the detail. The responsibilities (curae) of the many kinds of detail were distributed to the men by all the methods considered fair and democratic: lot, rotation and negotiation. Certain kinds of cura were assigned certain classes or types of troops; for example, wall sentries were chosen only from Velites. Soldiers could be temporarily or permanently exempted: the immunes. For example, a Triarius was immunis from the curae of the Hastati.

The duty year was divided into time slices, typically one or two months, which were apportioned to units, typically maniples or centuries. They were always allowed to negotiate who took the duty and when. The most common kind of cura were the posts of the sentinels, called the excubiae by day and the vigilae at night. Wall posts were praesidia, gate posts, custodiae, advance positions before the gates, stationes.

In addition were special guards and details. One post was typically filled by four men, one sentinel and the others at ease until a situation arose or it was their turn to be sentinel. Some of the details were:
guarding, cleaning and maintaining the principia.
guarding and maintaining the quarters of each tribune.
tending the horses of each cavalry turma.
guarding the praetorium.

See also

Fortification
Military history of ancient Rome
Roman legion
Outline of ancient Rome

References

Primary sources
 
 
  (Latin text.)
  Web publication on Bill Thayer's Polybius site.
  Legion xxiv website.
 
  Selections, Latin and English juxtaposed by paragraph. Translator unknown.
  Books I-III only. The unknown editor altered the translation "to conform to modern usage" and abbreviated the text. Access is by subtitle. Search only within subsection.

Secondary sources

External links

Below are a number of links to sites reporting or summarizing current research or thinking. Many are reprints of articles made available to the public at no charge. The historical researcher will find their bibliographies of great interest.

General
 
 
 
 
  Links to a Glossary.
The Romans in Britain, Glossary of Military terms. Note that both Latin and Greek terms with the same meaning are included.

Forts and fortifications
 
 
 
 

 
 
 . Article republished on Bill Thayer's LacusCurtius site, which has the advantage of linking to ancient texts cited by Smith.

Camp life
 
 
 
 

Ancient Roman city planning
Castles by type
Roman fortifications
Roman legionary fortresses